Australian Skeptics is a loose confederation of like-minded organisations across Australia that began in 1980. Australian Skeptics investigate paranormal and pseudoscientific claims using scientific methodologies. This page covers all Australian skeptical groups which are of this mindset. The name "Australian Skeptics" can be confused with one of the more prominent groups, "Australian Skeptics Inc", which is based in Sydney and is one of the central organising groups within Australian Skeptics.

Origins 

In 1979, Mark Plummer (later president of Australian Skeptics) sent a letter to the American skeptical magazine The Zetetic in which he expressed interest in beginning a skeptical organisation in Australia. Sydney electronics entrepreneur Dick Smith responded to the letter, and offered to sponsor a visit to Australia by James Randi, the principal investigator for the American-based Committee for the Scientific Investigation of Claims of the Paranormal (CSICOP), now known as the Committee for Skeptical Inquiry (CSI), part of the non-profit organisation Center for Inquiry (CFI), which are joint publishers of the Skeptical Inquirer. During this visit, James Randi, Dick Smith, Phillip Adams, Richard Carleton and an unidentified businessman offered a $50,000 prize to anyone who could prove psychic phenomena in front of Randi. A number of contenders, largely water diviners came forward, but all failed to prove their claims in front of independent observers.

The Australian Skeptics formed in 1980 out of this event, with the original purpose of continuing to test claims of the paranormal, with committee members Mark Plummer (president), James Gerrand (secretary), Joe Rubinstein (treasurer), and Allan Christophers, as well as Bill Cook, John Crellin, Logan Elliot, Peter Kemeny, Loris Purcell, and Mike Wilton. It was at this time that the group adopted the name "Australian Skeptics". The amount of the prize was raised to AU$100,000 and it has been offered since then (see The $100,000 Prize below). Very soon after the original formation of the Australian Skeptics in Victoria, Barry Williams from Sydney, New South Wales (NSW), responded to a call from Dick Smith seeking interest for new members. He became involved, and the New South Wales committee formed. The NSW committee included Barry Williams (president), Tim Mendham (secretary/treasurer), Mel Dickson, Dick Champion, Jean Whittle and others. The Australian Skeptics are the second oldest English language skeptical group in the world after CSICOP in the US. Tim Mendham joined the NSW committee from the very first meeting and went on to become secretary, treasurer, and editor of the magazine.

In 1986, the year after the first national convention in Sydney (see below), Mark Plummer stepped down as national president when he began a new job as an executive officer at CSICOP in the US. At this time the NSW Skeptics group took over the role as the national secretariat and the national committee, but the magazine production remained in Victoria with various editors including James Durand. The national committee did not consist of representative from all the state organisations, but rather was just of the state groups which acted as the national organising committee. "Australian Skeptics incorporated in NSW" (Australian Skeptics Inc. - ASI) became an incorporated association in 1986 in NSW with Barry Williams as president.

ASI still operates today and is responsible for several national activities, such as the publication of The Skeptic magazine and coordination of awards (listed below) and the annual conventions. Today ASI is one of many formal and informal skeptical groups throughout Australia that fall under the general umbrella title of "Australian Skeptics". Over time, other branches around Australia became incorporated including Australian Skeptics (Victorian Branch) Inc, Skeptics (S.A.) Incorporated, Hunter Skeptics Incorporated, Canberra Skeptics and Borderline Skeptics Inc (which caters for skeptics living around the NSW and Victorian border). ASI is the local group in NSW.

In 1995 the Australian Skeptics received a sizeable bequest from the estate of Stanley David Whalley. With these funds the organisation established the "Australian Skeptics Science and Education Foundation", tasked to expose "irrational activities and pseudoscience and to encourage critical thinking and the scientific view". This foundation now funds the "Thornett award for promotion of reason", known affectionately as "the Fred", named after the late Fred Thornett, an influential figure in the skeptical movement in Tasmania and nationally. "The Fred" is a $1000 prize given by ASI for significant contribution to educating or informing the public regarding issues of science and reason. The bequest also allowed for the introduction of a paid position, that of executive officer. This position is answerable to the ASI committee, and traditionally manages accounts, queries from the public and media, editing The Skeptic, and various sundry tasks. Barry Williams was executive officer from 1995 to 2009, followed by Karen Stollznow (2009) and Tim Mendham from 2009 to the present.

In 1989 at a national committee meeting the aims of Australian Skeptics were updated and drafted as follows:
 To investigate claims of pseudoscientific, paranormal and similarly anomalous phenomena from a responsible, scientific point of view.
 To publicise the results of these investigations and, where appropriate, to draw attention to the possibility of natural and ordinary explanations of such phenomena.
 To accept explanations and hypotheses about paranormal occurrences only after good evidence has been adduced, which directly or indirectly supports such hypotheses.
 To encourage Australians and the Australian news media to adopt a critical attitude towards paranormal claims and to understand that to introduce or to entertain a hypothesis does not constitute confirmation or proof of that hypothesis.
 To stimulate inquiry and the quest for truth, wherever it leads.

As of 2015, every state and territory within Australia has its own regional branch, and some have their own newsletters, with new local skeptics' groups springing up in Melbourne, Brisbane, Adelaide, Launceston and Darwin.

Awards and prizes

Thornett Award for the Promotion of Reason
The Thornett Award for the Promotion of Reason, affectionately known as "The Fred" (much like the Academy Award is known as the "Oscar"), is named after Fred Thornett, a noted member of Australian Skeptics from Tasmania who died in April 2009. The Fred award includes a $2000 cash prize (increased from $1000 in 2018) that is given to the recipient or to a charity or cause of their choice. It is awarded annually to a member of the public or a public figure who has made a significant contribution to educating or informing the public regarding issues of science and reason.

Skeptic of the Year
The Skeptic of the Year award is given annually to someone associated with the skeptical community who has been particularly active over the previous year. ASI coordinates the prize, and the final decision is voted on by representatives from the various Australian Skeptics groups.

Barry Williams Award for Skeptical Journalism

The Barry Williams Award for Skeptical Journalism which recognises "the best piece of journalism (in any medium) that takes a critical and skeptical approach to a topic" within the scope of the Australian Skeptics. The award is named in memory of Barry Williams who died in 2018 and carries a $AU2000 prize.  Williams was a past president and executive officer of Australian Skeptics who regularly appeared in the Australian media.  The award has been nicknamed "the Wallaby" after the nom-de-plume Sir Jim R Wallaby, used by Williams in some of his more whimsical writing.

Bent Spoon Awards

The Bent Spoon Award is an annual award coordinated by ASI, although the final decision is voted on by representatives from the various groups comprising Australian Skeptics. It is "presented to the perpetrator of the most preposterous piece of paranormal or pseudoscientific piffle" in a tongue-in-cheek fashion. The award trophy is a piece of gopher wood, supposedly from Noah's Ark, upon which is affixed a spoon rumoured to have been used at the Last Supper. The spoon was allegedly bent by energies unknown to science and gold plated by an Atlantean process. Although awarded annually since 1982, only one copy of the trophy exists, as "anyone wishing to acquire the trophy must remove it from our keeping by paranormal means" and no winner has yet overcome this obstacle.

The award is offered only to Australian individuals or groups, or those who have carried out their activities in Australia. The New Zealand Skeptics have a similar Bent Spoon Award.

∞ In 2012 the Australian Vaccination Network was ordered by the New South Wales Office of Fair Trading to change its name within two months.  The order was challenged, but the challenge was dismissed, and in 2014 the group changed its name to the Australian Vaccination-Skeptics Network.

$100,000 Prize  

Since its foundation in 1980, Australian Skeptics has been offering a cash prize to anyone who can prove they have psychic or paranormal powers and is able to demonstrate their ability under proper observing conditions. The offer has been made in an effort to seek out the truth of paranormal claims such as those of psychics, healers, witnesses to paranormal events and those selling devices which claim to defy scientific laws. If someone nominates another person, and that person is successful, then 20% of the prize may be awarded the nominator.

The challenge originally offered $50,000 to any water diviner who was able to demonstrate their powers, and it was later raised, with contributions from various sources, to AU$100,000 offered to anyone who could demonstrate any form of paranormal or psychic ability unknown to science. Up to the end of 2018, more than 200 claims have been seriously investigated but none of them has produced a positive result.

This challenge is now coordinated by ASI and the prize money is backed by the Australian Skeptics Science and Education Foundation. It is open to any contender who can state exactly what their paranormal claim is, and the claim can give a definite yes or no result. They must define under what conditions the claim can be performed, and expect to beat million to one odds in order to claim success. The result of each test is then published in The Skeptic, the magazine of Australian Skeptics. ASI states that should any contender pass the challenge, and be awarded the prize, they want to tell the world and give the claimant proper recognition. If, however, a claim is proved to be unfounded or fraudulent, the association reserve the right to expose this result in an effort to prevent clients from spending time and money on a product or service that cannot deliver what is claimed for it.

Eureka / Critical Thinking Prize
The Australian Museum Eureka Awards is a series of annual awards presented by the Australian Museum in partnership with their sponsors, for excellence in various fields. Until 2005 the Australian Skeptics were major sponsors of the award for critical thinking, which during this period was awarded to:

∞ The 2000 Spring edition of The Skeptic magazine erroneously listed Richard Kocsis as the 1999 winner

After 2005 the Australian Skeptics decided to withdraw from the Eurekas, and award their own critical thinking Prize known as the Australian Skeptics Critical Thinking Prize. The winners are as follows:

Both of these prizes have been discontinued.

Regional and state groups

New South Wales
 Australian Skeptics Inc.
 Hunter Skeptics

Victoria
 Australian Skeptics (Victorian Branch) Inc.
 Ballarat Skeptics
 Borderline Skeptics Inc.
 Citizens for Science
 Great Ocean Road Skeptics
 Melbourne Eastern Hills Skeptics in the Pub
 Melbourne Skeptics
 Mordi Skeptics
 Young Australian Skeptics

Queensland
 Brisbane Skeptic Society Inc.
 Gold Coast Skeptics
 Queensland Skeptics Association Inc.

Australian Capital Territory
 Canberra Skeptics

Western Australia
 WA Skeptics
 Perth Skeptics

South Australia
 Skeptics SA
 Thinking and Drinking

Tasmania
 Hobart Skeptics
 Launceston Skeptics

Northern Territory
 Darwin Skeptics

Past events

National conventions
The Australian Skeptics National Convention is the longest running annual skeptical convention, and has been held annually since 1985.

No Answers in Genesis
No Answers in Genesis is a website affiliated with the Australian Skeptics organisation that provides information to defend the theory of evolution, and, more specifically, counter young Earth creationist arguments put forward by Answers in Genesis. It was founded by Australian atheist and skeptic John Stear, a retired civil servant. The website contains links, essays and other postings that rebut creationist arguments against evolution. Stear states that the site is meant for educational purposes as well as to illustrate the problems with young Earth creationism. The site also contains simple introductions to evolutionary concepts. It mainly has posts on creationism, but now has some essays on "intelligent design". It has two discussion boards.

In June 2005, members of the creationist group Answers in Genesis – Australia debated a team from the Australian Skeptics online on Margo Kingston's web diary section of the Sydney Morning Herald website.

Psychic hoaxes
In 1984 the Australian Skeptics brought magician Bob Steiner to Australia to pose as a psychic under the name "Steve Terbot". He went on The Bert Newton Show with Derryn Hinch who was in on the hoax, and accused him of being a charlatan. He also performed shows to live audiences in Melbourne and Sydney, pretending to be psychic. He later returned to the Bert Newton Show to reveal that he was a magician performing a hoax.

Later in February 1988 Richard Carleton, a reporter on the TV show 60 Minutes, brought James Randi back to Australia to oversee an elaborate hoax involving a fictional character named Carlos who was reported to be a 2,000-year-old entity who had last appeared in the body of a 12-year-old boy in Venezuela in 1900 was now manifesting through a young American art student named José Alvarez. In reality José had no special abilities, and was actually Randi's partner and assistant. The hoax involved the character Carlos appearing on various television shows in character and culminated in channel nine hosting a large media event at the Sydney Opera House where members from the Australian Skeptics were interviewed in front of a large audience of believers. The Australian Skeptics had not been made aware of the hoax until hours before it was revealed, a few days later, on 60 Minutes. There was outrage amongst the Australian media, to which Randi responded by pointing out that none of the journalists had bothered with even the most elementary fact-checking measures. There were some among the Australian Skeptics who took the view that this hoax had the potential of harming the good relationships that had been formed with certain media organisations, possibly discouraging them from reporting critically on similar stories in the future, and instead leaving such stories to other, less skeptical media organisations.

Historical investigations and demonstrations
Over the years the Australian Skeptics have conducted many investigations and demonstrations. Some examples are as follows:

Divining
In the early 1980s Dick Smith brought James Randi to Australia to conduct a test to determine whether those who conduct water divining have any real abilities. They laid out a grid of plastic irrigation pipes which were able to have water flowing or not flowing, and then challenged water diviners to determine which pipes contained the running water. Prior to the testing, the diviners agreed that the experimental conditions were suitable, however, when they were unable to display any ability, they changed their positions and blamed various external influences for preventing their success. This experiment was repeated several times beginning in 2001 using bottled water and bottled sand hidden within paper bags, with similar results.

Water powered car
In 1983 Ian Bryce and Mark Plummer investigated a patent filed for a "water powered car", designed by Stephen Horvath. The car was well publicised in the media of the day, and promoted by the then Premier of Queensland; Joh Bjelke-Petersen. The investigation concluded that the claim that the car was powered by nuclear fusion was not supported by evidence.

Psychic surgery
In 1981 when James Randi was visiting Australia he demonstrated how psychic surgery can be performed by sleight of hand with no actual surgery taking place. This was then later demonstrated again by the Australian Skeptics at a convention held in Sydney. The publicity from these demonstrations led to other forms of media, including the Australian Penthouse magazine publishing the story.

Fire walking
The Victorian Skeptics have demonstrated several times how firewalking or lying on a bed of nails can be achieved without any harm to the person. As publicity stunts they had various celebrities such as Steve Moneghetti, as well as committee members including Barry Williams, demonstrate fire walking, and then invited members of the public to repeat the stunt.

Publications

The Skeptic magazine 
The journal of the Australian Skeptics is called The Skeptic. The first issue of The Skeptic came out of Melbourne in January 1981, edited by Mark Plummer and produced by James Gerrand. The first issue was a black and white broadsheet tabloid. For many years the logo was the same logo as the American publication the Skeptical Inquirer only photocopied with the end chopped off. After that first issue, the format was reduced to a standard A4 publication produced on a typewriter. In the early days of the Australian Skeptics there was a strong focus on media and outreach, and the magazine ran a special column in each issue listing all media coverage for that period. After the national secretariat moved up to NSW in 1986, the production of the magazine was moved to the Sydney branch in 1987 with Tim Mendham as the new editor, and at this time the magazine was produced on a computer (a Macintosh) for the first time. About a year before the change, there was a competition held to choose a new logo for the Australian Skeptics, and this new logo was used in the magazines up until the 1990s. In 1988 for the first time the magazine was produced with a cover, showing the title and various art work, and for a few years after that the publication was produced in a different colour for each issue. In 1990 Tim Mendham stepped down as editor and Barry Williams took on the role, intending to only edit one issue in 1991, but then remaining in the role until 2008. Both Karen Stollznow and Steve Roberts were editors briefly in 2009, until editing was handed back to Tim Mendham in June 2009, and with whom it remains today.

Books
The first big project that the Australian Skeptics undertook was in the 1980s when two scientists, Martin Bridgstock and Ken Smith, researched the various claims of creationism, and the Australian Skeptics, along with other authors, published a very successful book detailing their debunking of creationist claims. The book, titled Creationism: An Australian Perspective was first published 1986. At this time creationism was still being taught in science classes in some public schools in Queensland, but this research led to campaigns led by Martin Bridgstock, which resulted in creationism being removed from science classes. Ken Smith and Martin Bridgestock were both awarded the first life memberships in the Australian Skeptics at the 1986 convention for this service.

The Australian Skeptics also re-published the book Gellerism Revealed: The Psychology and Methodology Behind the Geller Effect by Ben Harris, originally published in 1985.

The Canberra Skeptics also published a book titled Skeptical which gave one- to two-page overviews of various skeptical topics.

Booklet
During the creationism in science classes debate, the Australian Skeptics attended a talk by a creationist geologist and collected various leaflets at that event. They responded to the leaflets by setting up a small sub-committee for the purpose of researching and responding to the various points raised in the creationist leaflets. The results of this research were published in a booklet in 1991 titled "Creationism-Scientists Respond".

Skeptical Australian podcasts and radio programs

Criticisms 
There are claims the NSW Skeptics have over-reached in claiming the name 'Australian' skeptics, and also that supporters have no democratic standing, the group being akin to an 'invite only' gentlemen's club, amongst other criticisms about how they conduct themselves generally

References

External links 
 

Australian Skeptics Society
Prizes for proof of paranormal phenomena
Ironic and humorous awards
1980 establishments in Australia
Organizations established in 1980